Acanthagrion is a genus of damselflies. It is the dominant genus of damselfly at ponds and lakes in the Neotropics but A. quadratum is the only one found in North America. They are commonly known as Wedgetails because of the raised tip of the abdomen.

The genus contains the following species:

References

Coenagrionidae
Zygoptera genera
Taxa named by Edmond de Sélys Longchamps